Sir George Yonge, 5th Baronet, KCB, PC (17 July 1731 – 25 September 1812), of Escot House in the parish of Talaton in Devon, England, was a British Secretary at War (1782–1783 and 1783–1794). He succeeded to his father's baronetcy in 1755, which became extinct when he died without children. He is remembered by, among other things, the name of Yonge Street, a principal road in what is now Toronto, Canada, so named in 1793 by the Lieutenant-Governor of Upper Canada, John Graves Simcoe.

Life and career

Yonge was born in 1731 at Great House in the parish of Colyton, Devon, the son and heir of Sir William Yonge, 4th Baronet (1693–1755) by his second wife Ann Howard. He had a stepbrother, Walter Yonge, from his father's first wife Mary Heathcote.

He was educated at Eton College and then at the University of Leipzig. 
He served as a Member of Parliament for his family's Rotten Borough of Honiton, Devon, from 1754 to 1761 and again from 1763 to 1796.  He was quoted to have often said that he had inherited £80,000 from his father, acquired another £80,000 when he married and £80,000 from Parliament but Honiton had "swallowed it all," This was due to the huge briberies which were commonplace to influence the electorate in rotten borough elections of the time. Yonge was appointed to the Privy Council of the United Kingdom in 1782, and acted as Governor of the Cape Colony for a short period from 1799 to 1801. He was elected a Fellow of the Royal Society in 1784  and was invested as a Knight of the Bath in 1788.

In 1755, he inherited Escot House near Ottery St Mary, Devon, on the death of his father. In 1794, he sold it for £26,000 to Sir John Kennaway, 1st Baronet, under whose occupancy it burnt down in 1808.

When Yonge died, indebted, on 25 September 1812 at Hampton Court, the baronetcy died with him. Initially he was interred at the place of his death but his remains were later exhumed and transported by sea to be laid to rest in the family crypt in the parish of Colyton.  The re-burial was reputed to have taken place by night in fear that his creditors may seize the body.

Family
Yonge married Ann Cleeve, daughter and sole heir of Bourchier Cleeve, on 10 July 1765. Yonge was then 34 years old and Ann 20 or perhaps just 21. Ann's father, two days before his death, changed his will to place restrictions on Ann's inheritance should she marry someone whom her mother deemed inappropriate. Whether this occurred is not clear.

Ann had no children. She died at Hampton on 7 January 1833.

There is great confusion in many sources, both online and in print, that give George Yonge's wife's name as Elizabeth. This seems to be a mistake. For a discussion, see the talk page.

Legacy
 
Yonge was considered an expert on Roman roads: 'He was a man of letters, an F.R.S., and a Fellow of the Society of Antiquaries, to which he communicated an excellent memoir on the subject of Roman roads and camps, in connection with some discoveries that had been made at Mansfied, in Nottinghamshire, and hence the peculiar fitness of naming Yonge Street after him, it being precisely such a road, and adapted to similar uses, as those he had been engaged in examining.'

Yonge Street, the main north–south street of Toronto, was built between 1795 and 1796 from Eglinton Avenue to Lake Simcoe. Later the road was extended south to Bloor Street and still later, south to Lake Ontario. Yonge Mills Road and Townline Road Escott Yonge in Front of Yonge Township in Mallorytown, Ontario are named for him as well.

References

External links

 Yonge Street and Dundas Street : the men after whom they were named : a paper from the Canadian journal of literature, science and history. Henry Scadding

1731 births
1812 deaths
People educated at Eton College
Leipzig University alumni
Baronets in the Baronetage of England
British MPs 1754–1761
British MPs 1761–1768
British MPs 1768–1774
British MPs 1774–1780
British MPs 1780–1784
British MPs 1784–1790
British MPs 1790–1796
British MPs 1796–1800
Governors of the Cape Colony
Knights Companion of the Order of the Bath
Lords of the Admiralty
Members of the Parliament of Great Britain for Honiton
Members of the Privy Council of Great Britain
Masters of the Mint
Fellows of the Royal Society
Members of Parliament for Old Sarum
Members of the Parliament of the United Kingdom for English constituencies
UK MPs 1801–1802